Shamoon Abbasi (born 4 April 1973) is a Pakistani actor, director and screenwriter, better known for portraying villain roles.

Family
His father Zuhair Abbasi was a novelist and drama writer, and so is his aunt, Seema Ghazal. Syed Ali Raza Usama, a director better known for the movie Main Hoon Shahid Afridi and the most expensive drama ever made in Pakistan, Bashar Momin, is Seema's son, thus Shamoon's cousin. His sister Anoushay Abbasi is an actress, while his erstwhile wife, Javeria Abbasi, is a TV personality as well, and their daughter, Anzela Abbasi, is a TV actress too. 

Being married to Anoushay, Ainan Arif, the son of late Pakistan international cricketer Taslim Arif and actress Rubina Arif who had the role of "Micheal Magnet" in the 2013 movie Main Hoon Shahid Afridi, is his brother-in-law.

Career
Shamoon Abbasi started his acting career from Yasir Akhtar's popular telefilm 'Titlee' of Tapal Cinema in 1996. later, Mr.Abbasi joined Yasir Akhtar's Pegasus Productions as an assistant director and assisted Mr.Akhtar for his telefilms Shehzadi, Zeher and Chand. Later, Abbasi has directed adventure shows such as the Indonesian game show Morven Gold Aventure Bali, Sunsilk 21st Century Woman of Pakistan, Rescue 15 (a show based on a police department), and reality shows including Saaye, which is based on paranormal activities.

Being the one who introduced web-series in Pakistan with his 2007 release #6dapak, which also won international awards, in 2019 he will direct and play the lead role in another web-series, 'The legend of JAWED IQBAL, about the famous serial-killer. While another 2019 web-series, Mind Games, where he's one of the lead actors, might make it to Netflix, his 2019 movies release will be Durj, a suspense-thriller on cannibalism based on true events, he directed and acted it, and which will be screen at Cannes. Another 2019 movie release is Chaudhry The Martyr, an action-biopic based on the life of Chaudhry Aslam Khan, a famous policeman assassinated by the Taliban, and he'll play the role of his friend.

In 2022 he starred in the drama Bakhtawar while in terms of movies he played the role of alleged Indian spy Kulbhushan Jadhav in the movie Dhai Chaal.

Filmography
{| class="wikitable sortable"
|- style="text-align:center;"
! Year
! Title
! Role
! Notes
|-
| 2011
| Bhai Log
| Inspector Nagra
| 
|-
| 2013
| Waar
| Ramal
| 
|-
| 2014
| O21
| Danish
| 
|-
|2015
|Manto
|Eishar Singh
|
|-
| 2016
| Sawal 700 Crore Dollar Ka
| Super Cop
| 
|-
| 2017
| Raasta
|shahnawaz
| 
|-
| 2018
| Parwaaz Hai Junoon
| 
| 
|-
| 2019
| Gumm: In the Middle of Nowhere
|Haider
| Post-Production
|-
| 2019
| Durj
| Gul Bakhsh
| Post-Production
|-
|rowspan=4|2022
|Ishrat Made in China
| Master BP
|
|-
|Chaudhry – The Martyr
|TBA
|
|-
| The Legend of Maula Jatt
| 
| Releasing 13 October
|-
| Dhai Chaal
| 
| 
|-
| rowspan="4"|TBA
| Debal: Uncrowned Underdogs
| 
| Filming
|-
| The Trial| 
| Filming (Directed by Kamran Shahid)
|-
| Iqbal Kashmiris untitled
| 
| announced
|-
|Delhi Gate|
|
|-
|}

Television
As an actor
 Titlee (Telefilm from Tapal Cinema) by Yasir Akhtar, Pegasus Productions
 Chand (Telefilm from Tapal Cinema) by Yasir Akhtar, Pegasus Productions 
 Kashish Choti Si Kahani Bulbulay Guest appearance
Iqraar
 Ooas (2014-2015) PTV Home
Judaai
 Phir Wohi Mohabbat (Hum TV)
Mind Games
 Gunah (Express TV)

As a director
 Chalawa'' (Hum TV), along with Najaf Bilgrami, Horror drama

References

External links 
 

Living people
Pakistani male film actors
Pakistani male television actors
1973 births
Male actors in Urdu cinema